The Village by the Sea: an Indian family story is a novel for young people by the Indian  writer Anita Desai, published in London by Heinemann in 1982. It is based on the poverty, hardships and sorrow faced by a small rural, community in India. Desai won the annual Guardian Children's Fiction Prize, a book award judged by a panel of British children's writers. It has 13 chapters.

Penguin published a US edition in 1984.

Plot
The Village by the Sea is set in a small village called Thul in Western India (14 kilometres from Bombay) and focuses on a family trying to make ends meet. The main protagonists are Lila, the eldest child who is 13 years old, and her 12-year-old brother Hari. They also have two younger sisters, Bela and Kamal. They live with their mother, who has been chronically ill and is bed-ridden. Their father is an alcoholic, which forces Hari and Lila to manage the family. There is a lot of pressure on them due to the constant demand for meeting their needs. He wasn't earning money but used to take debts from villagers at the toddy shop to buy alcohol. With two younger sisters and a bedridden mother to take care of, life for Lila and Hari is too hard. Hari decides that he has had enough and leaves for Bombay to find work. Lila is left alone to take care of her family and struggles to do so. Help comes from an unexpected source, the rich De Silvas who have a beach house- Mon Repos next to their hut. Meanwhile, Hari is new in the city of dreams, Bombay and he is all alone. A kind restaurant owner, Jagu, pities upon him and welcomes him to work in his restaurant. There, Hari builds a strong friendship with Mr. Panwallah, the lovable watch repairer whose shop is just beside the shop Jagu had. Through his experience with Mr. Panwallah and Jagu and the chain of events that take place in Bombay, Hari realizes that he could actually make a career as a watchmaker. Meanwhile, Lila, Bela, and Kamal admit their sick mother in the town hospital through the help of the De Silvas. Their father turns over a new leaf and accompanies their mother throughout her 7-month treatment. When Hari returns to the village soon-after, he finds the environment of his home totally changed. As Hari reunites with his sisters, they all begin sharing stories with each other detailing the changes that took place after Hari left. Hari also explains the watch repair skills he learned in Bombay and reveals his plans to start a small repair shop in the village. Together; Lila, Hari, Bela, and Kamal all form a plan to use Hari's saved money (which he made and brought back from Bombay) to start a small chicken farm as a start-up business for the family and financial support base for Hari's future repair shop. As Hari goes to the village to buy a chicken netting fence and tools to build a chicken pen, Sayyid Ali Sahib a researcher who is staying in Mon Repos converses with him and marvels at Hari upon learning his plans. As the novel ends, Sayyid Ali Sahib highlights Hari and his sister's resolve to adapt and change in this growing and ever-developing world.

Anita Desai has explicitly described in her very own style of writing, and she shows how Hari in the dilapidated conditions of the Sri Krishna Eating House finds warmth and affection through Mr Andal Panwallah – owner and watch mender of the Ding-Dong watch shop. Mr Panwallah instills confidence in Hari and comforts him when he is terribly home sick. He even gives Hari a vivid and inspiring future and teaches him watch mending. This shows that even in one of the busiest, rickety and ramshackle cities such as Bombay there is still hope, love and affection.''' 
He also goes back to Thul with the help of Mr Panwallah and Jagu insisting to buy the bus ticket. Jagu's generosity by giving him some extra money to be brought back to his family.

Reception
"Desai's subject matter may be stereotypical, but her treatment and sensitive prose give depth to the story, Every minute detail and image ... assumes meaning and fits into the intricate, multi-layered pattern of the novel."

Adaptation 
It was adapted into a television series of the same name by the BBC in 1991. There was one notable actor Saeed Jaffrey who played the part of Mr. Penwala the watchmaker. A novice actor named Nishan R. Wijesinghe played the lead role of Hari.

References

External links
   —immediately, a record for a US edition 
Summary

 

British children's novels
Guardian Children's Fiction Prize-winning works
Novels by Anita Desai
Novels set in Maharashtra
1982 British novels
Heinemann (publisher) books
1982 children's books
Indian novels adapted into television shows